Kingsley Township is a township in Griggs County, North Dakota, United States.

History
Pleasant View Township was designated by Congress on February 9, 1888. The township board met on February 23, 1893 and discussed the possibility of dividing Pleasant View into two Townships - Clearfield and Kingsley.  There is no record of any action being taken.  However, on July 9, 1894, it seemed to have been separated and Clearfield Township was in existence, so Kingsley Township must have been formed sometime after February 9, 1888

Demographics
Its population during the 2010 census was 92.

Location within Griggs County
Kingsley Township is located in Township 146 Range 61 west of the Fifth principal meridian.

References

Townships in Griggs County, North Dakota